Colombia is a relatively open, free market economy that is party to many free trade agreements (FTAs) worldwide. It has signed free trade agreements with many of its biggest trading partners including the United States and the European Union, and is a founding member of the Pacific Alliance regional trade bloc.

Free trade agreements in force
 Pacific Alliance (founding member, along with México, Perú and Chile)
 Panama - Colombia Agreement
 Canada–Colombia Free Trade Agreement
  El Salvador, Guatemala, Honduras - Colombia Free Trade Agreements
 United States-Colombia Free Trade Agreement
 Colombia – European free trade association (Efta) agreement
 Colombia – European Union Association agreement

Trade organization membership
 Pacific Alliance (founding member)
 Andean Community
 Caribbean Community (CARICOM) Agreement
 World Trade Organization
 Latin American Integration Association

Free trade agreements awaiting approval
There are no trade agreements awaiting approval as of February 2016.

References